The League of Imaginary Scientists is a Los Angeles-based art group specializing in Pataphysics, Interactive Art and Art/Science Collaborations. The League was founded in 2006, and has since created work for many venues, including The Museum of Contemporary Art, Los Angeles, The Museum of Contemporary Art, Copenhagen and The California Institute of the Arts.  They were the recipients of the Apexart residency in 2009, and The FUSE grant for development of site-specific art.

The principal members are:

 Dr. Hernandez-Gomez (Lucy HG)
 Dr. Stephan Schleidan (Steve Shoffner)
 Prof. William T. Madmann (Jeremy Speed Schwartz)
 Prof. J. Johansen (Matt Solomon)
 Prof. Troubadour (Leonard Trubia)

References

External links 
 Imaginary Science.org

American artist groups and collectives
Arts organizations based in California
Organizations based in Los Angeles
Arts organizations established in 2006
2006 establishments in California